Diontae Spencer (born March 19, 1992) is an American football wide receiver and return specialist for the New York Jets of the National Football League (NFL). Born in New Iberia, Louisiana, he played college football with the McNeese State Cowboys, where his highest one-game total had been 365 yards, with five touchdowns. He made his professional debut for the Toronto Argonauts (CFL) in 2015. Spencer has also been a member of the St. Louis Rams and Pittsburgh Steelers of the NFL and Ottawa Redblacks of the CFL.

Professional career 
After going undrafted in the 2014 NFL Draft, Spencer participated in spring mini-camp with the Chicago Bears.

St. Louis Rams 
Spencer signed with the St. Louis Rams on May 27, 2014. Spencer was waived by the team in July.

Toronto Argonauts 
Spencer signed with the Toronto Argonauts in December 2014. Spencer had a productive two seasons in Toronto, catching 107 passes for 1,208 yards with six touchdowns. He also returned 39 punts and 27 kickoff returns.

Ottawa Redblacks 
On the second day of free agency Spencer signed with the Ottawa Redblacks. On October 27, 2017, in a game against the Hamilton Tiger-Cats, Spencer set a CFL single-game record with 496 all-purpose yards: 133 yards receiving, 165 kick-off return yards and 169 punt return yards. Overall, Spencer had an exceptional 2017 campaign with the Redblacks, catching 71 passes for 922 yards with six touchdowns. He also returned 70 punts and 25 kickoffs, and was named a CFL-East All-Star as a returner. On January 31, 2018 Spencer had a workout with the NFL's Baltimore Ravens. Nevertheless, less than one week before becoming a free agent Spencer and the Redblacks agreed on a contract extension on February 7, 2018. Despite recording his first 1,000 yard season in 2018, Spencer did not make the CFL-East All-Star list as a receiver, but did make it as a returner for the 11–7 Redblacks, who finished the year at the top of the division. After advancing to the CFL championship game, Spencer had a costly fumble on a return, and the Redblacks lost  the 106th Grey Cup to Calgary, 27–16.

Pittsburgh Steelers
On January 4, 2019, Spencer signed a reserve/future contract with the Pittsburgh Steelers of the NFL. He was waived on August 31, 2019.

Denver Broncos
On September 1, 2019, Spencer was claimed off waivers by the Denver Broncos. Spencer signed a one-year exclusive-rights free agent tender with the Broncos on April 18, 2020. He was placed on the reserve/COVID-19 list by the team on November 27, 2020, and activated on December 10. Spencer had his first career NFL touchdown in Week 14 of the 2020 season, when he returned a punt 83 yards against the Carolina Panthers during the 32–27 win.
Spencer was named the AFC Special Teams Player of the Week for his performance in Week 14.

The Broncos placed another exclusive-rights free agent tender on Spencer on March 16, 2021. He signed the one-year contract on April 16.

New York Jets
On September 6, 2022, Spencer signed with the practice squad of the New York Jets. He was released from the practice squad eight days later. He was then re-signed to the practice squad six days later. He was once again released from the practice squad a week later. He was re-signed on October 11. He signed a reserve/future contract on January 31, 2023.

References

External links
 Denver Broncos bio
 Ottawa Redblacks bio
 CFL stats

1992 births
Living people
Ottawa Redblacks players
McNeese Cowboys football players
Canadian football wide receivers
Canadian football return specialists
American football wide receivers
People from New Iberia, Louisiana
Toronto Argonauts players
St. Louis Rams players
African-American players of American football
African-American players of Canadian football
Players of American football from Louisiana
Pittsburgh Steelers players
Denver Broncos players
New York Jets players
American football return specialists
21st-century African-American sportspeople